Rovnag Ibrahim oghlu Abdullayev (born 3 April 1965 in Nakhchivan, Azerbaijan) is the CEO of the SOCAR oil company and has been president of the Association of Football Federations of Azerbaijan since 2008. He is a member of National Assembly of Azerbaijan.

Career
He was born on April 4, 1965 in Nakhchivan. Abdullayev received his degree in Civil Engineering from the Faculty of Industrial and Civil Engineering of Moscow State University of Civil Engineering in 1989.

In 1989, Abdullayev began working for the Neft Dashlari Oil and Gas Production Department of the Caspian Sea Oil & Gas Production Association. He continued to work there as an engineer until his appointment as Head of the Industrial Engineering Division of Construction and Mounting Department, Number Three, of Caspian Sea Oil & Gas Construction Trust. He later acted as their Chief Engineer between 1991 and 1994. Between 1997 and 2003 he was Manager of the Caspian Sea Oil & Gas Construction Trust before moving on to be the director of the Heydar Aliyev Baku Oil Refinery, previously known as Azerneftyanajag, until 2005.

He was Neftchi Baku's president from 2004 to 2008.

Footnotes

External links 
 Rovnag Abdullayev's profile 
 Biography of Rovnag Abdullayev (In Russian)

1965 births
Living people
People from the Nakhchivan Autonomous Republic
Members of the National Assembly (Azerbaijan)
Neftçi PFK
Association of Football Federations of Azerbaijan
SOCAR